Yankee Group was an independent technology research and consulting firm, founded in 1970 by Howard Anderson. The firm "was one of the analyst industry’s most prestigious boutiques through the dot.com boom, with 70 analysts on the payroll in 2006."

In 1996, Yankee was sold to Primark, then to Reuters in 2000 for $72.5 million. In May 2004, Yankee was bought by Decision Matrix Group for around $30 million. It was acquired by 451 Research on January 3, 2013.

References

Technology companies established in 1970
Companies based in Boston
Information technology consulting firms of the United States
Research and analysis firms
Defunct companies based in Massachusetts
1970 establishments in Massachusetts
Technology companies disestablished in 2013
2013 disestablishments in Massachusetts
2013 mergers and acquisitions
American companies established in 1970
American companies disestablished in 2013